Russian Antarctic Expedition (RAE) is a continuous expedition of the Arctic and Antarctic research Institute Russian Federal service for Hydrometeorology and environmental monitoring of Russia. In RAE, wintering involves conducting in Antarctica for about a year, and seasonal units running in the summer.

History 
The successor of the Soviet Antarctic Expedition, working since 1955. RAE is a participant in the subprogramme "Study and investigation of Antarctica" of the Russian Federal target program "World ocean".

In the fall of 2011 began 57th seasonal expedition. At five permanent and several seasonal polar stations, employs over 200 permanent and seasonal staff. Work is underway to transfer the main base of the expedition from the station "Mirny" to the station "Progress".

Antarctic expeditions
Antarctica research agencies
Russia and the Antarctic